Manav Gupta (born 29 December 1967) is an artist from India who has pioneered collaborative art as performances and mega murals. He has co-opted his art practices in paintings, poetry, music and sound to create one-minute films on climate change, sustainable development, ecosystems and alternate energy for public service messages commissioned by the Ministry of Environment & Forests, Government of India (2005–2006,2011).

He has won international acclaim for his first of its kind six floor high 5000 sq ft in facade and 10000 sq ft of total painted surface, commissioned mega mural at the headquarters of a leading telecom corporate giant in Gurgaon near Delhi, India in 2010, where he  painted Live for three months while involving thousands of employees' brush strokes in his creation "The Tree of Life".
The Tree of Life is the tallest and largest three-dimensional indoor staircase mural by artist Manav Gupta. It covers approximately 5,000 sq ft of visible frontage through a glass façade and 10,000 sq ft of total painted surface. Its significance lies in the methodology of creation as a work of contemporary art, with the first of its kind simultaneous use of four different art practices in conceptual, site specific, collaborative and performance art.

When commissioned by Bharti Airtel Ltd to create a "staircase artwork" at their headquarters, the artist introduced a unique sustainable development process in corporate entity, by establishing that art can contribute to the business environment as well, by refreshing the intangible quality of its soft power among employees. 
Adding a collaborative dimension, he conceptualised the mural as a public art project by allowing thousands of employees the experience of putting brush strokes. In the process, a series of role plays of teaching and motivating employees took effect as performance art. In the second half of the project, a three dimensional site specific composition took shape. With Gupta working solo all through the day, live in front of 3500 employees and almost as many visitors at the corporate campus site, the mural took three months to complete as an evolving storyline of five elements in Nature. Keeping in mind the visibility of the staircase all over the campus through a 60 ft high glass facade, the site specific intervention amalgamated the background wall and the front face of the staircase perspectives of five floors into a single canvas merging surrounding sides and roof within one composition.

He has pioneered co-creation with his "Jugalbandis" (Collaborations) with leading musicians, poets, dancers including Dr. L. Subramanium, Shubha Mudgal, Anup Jalota,  Rahul Sharma where he translates a performing artist's oeuvre live on stage on canvas (2003–2011).He has co authored a book of poems and paintings with former President of India Dr A.P.J. Abdul Kalam, published by Penguin India.(2002–2005).

Work and style 
Gupta has been listed by Financial Times among the top ten contemporaryIndian artists whose works would fetch good returns. Gupta's works have been sold by Christie's, Bonhams, Philip de Pury and are in leading permanent public collections around the world including the Parliament of India, the Rashtrapati Bhawan, the Royal family of Oman, Indian embassies abroad, Chitrakala Parishad and Birla Academy museums, etc.

One of the youngest members to have been nominated on the Expert Committee of India's National Republic Day celebrations for consecutive years, he has been invited for many an advisory role including the formative process of the Museum of Natural History, New Delhi.

Working on a 360-degree platform of canvases, video installations and performances he collaborated with dance troupes and audiences in public art projects besides his performances and exhibitions at different venues along his three-month travelling trilogy across United States and Europe in 2010 including New York, Amherst, Des Moines, San Francisco, Berlin, and London. He also delivered guest lectures on art, environment and collaborative public art practices at the San Jose State University and the ICD, Berlin in 2010.

In 2011, he delineated Bhutan–India relations on a public mural commissioned by the Government of India and mounted in Bhutan. The monumental work consists of a suite of eighteen feet and twelve feet high canvases mapping the political, socio-cultural, spiritual and natural archival history of friendship between the two countries.

Gupta creates single edition functional sculptures and public installations with varied media including iron, steel, wood, discarded roots of trees, glass, recycled scrap metal and clay for interior and exterior corporate and private spaces.

Trained in Kolkata at the Academy of Fine Arts under Rathin Maitra and under his guru Vasant Pandit, the artist currently works in New Delhi.

References 

Category:Indian male contemporary artists

1967 births
Living people
Artists from Kolkata
Conceptual artists
Indian contemporary painters
Indian installation artists
Indian performance artists
Indian male sculptors
20th-century Indian painters
21st-century Indian painters
Indian contemporary sculptors
20th-century Indian sculptors
Indian male painters
Painters from West Bengal
20th-century Indian male artists
21st-century Indian male artists